Denis Vyacheslavovich Ugarov (born 26 November 1975) is a Russian professional football coach and a former player.

Club career
He made his professional debut in the Russian Second Division in 1993 for FC Zenit-2 St. Petersburg.

Honours
 Russian Premier League bronze: 2001.
 Russian Cup winner: 1999.
 Russian Cup finalist: 2002.

European club competitions
With FC Zenit St. Petersburg.

 UEFA Cup 1999–2000: 2 games.
 UEFA Intertoto Cup 2000: 7 games.
 UEFA Cup 2002–03: 2 games.

External links

1975 births
Footballers from Saint Petersburg
Living people
Russian footballers
Association football midfielders
Russian Premier League players
FC Zenit Saint Petersburg players
Russian football managers
FC Metallurg Lipetsk players
FC Irtysh Omsk players
Russian expatriate football managers
Expatriate football managers in Estonia
JK Sillamäe Kalev managers
FC Lokomotiv Saint Petersburg players
FC Zenit-2 Saint Petersburg players